Volodymyr Mykolayovych Savchenko (born 9 September 1973) is a Ukrainian football coach and a former player who played as goalkeeper. He works as a goalkeepers' coach for the Under-19 squad of FC Rostov. He played for FC Seoul of the South Korean K League, then known as Anyang LG Cheetahs.

Honours
 Russian Cup winner: 2004.
 Russian Cup finalist: 2003.
 Russian First Division best goalkeeper: 2004.

European club competitions
 1999 UEFA Intertoto Cup with FC Rostselmash Rostov-on-Don: 1 game.
 2000 UEFA Intertoto Cup with FC Rostselmash Rostov-on-Don: 1 game.
 2004–05 UEFA Cup qualification rounds with FC Terek Grozny: 4 games.

References

External links
 
 

1973 births
Living people
Sportspeople from Donetsk Oblast
Ukrainian footballers
Ukraine international footballers
Ukrainian expatriate footballers
Ukrainian expatriate sportspeople in South Korea
Expatriate footballers in South Korea
Expatriate footballers in Russia
Association football goalkeepers
Russian Premier League players
FC Metalist Kharkiv players
FC Seoul players
FC Rostov players
FC Akhmat Grozny players
FC Lada-Tolyatti players
K League 1 players
Ukraine under-21 international footballers